The Electric Spanking of War Babies is the twelfth studio album by the American funk rock band Funkadelic, released in April 1981 on Warner Bros. Records. The title is an allusion to the Vietnam War and baby boomers. Sly Stone contributed to the recording sessions, singing lead vocals on "Funk Gets Stronger (Killer Millimeter Longer Version)".

Background
Clinton originally planned on a double album, but the idea was quashed by Warner Brothers. The original tracklist featured the instrumental version of the title track found on the 12" single's b-side, as well as the tracks "May Day (S.O.S.)" and "I Angle", later released on the George Clinton Family Series albums Plush Funk and Testing Positive 4 the Funk, respectively. The title refers to the US government's use of media propaganda to promote imperialism and war.

It includes many relative newcomers to P-Funk, many of whom remained employed by George Clinton on future releases under his own name or under the name George Clinton & the P-Funk All-Stars.  Of all the original group members since Funkadelic's debut album, only George Clinton, Ray Davis, and Eddie Hazel appear on this album. Junie Morrison plays all the instruments on the title track except the guitar solo which was played by Michael Hampton. This was the last Album to feature Eddie Hazel, Ray Davis, Garry Shider, Junie Morrison, Mallia Franklin, and Jessica Cleaves. Also this is the only Funkadelic album the late Roger Troutman appears on as well. Sly Stone performs several instruments and contributed production work to the album.

Artwork controversy
The cover artwork was designed by long-time Funkadelic collaborator Pedro Bell. Deemed inappropriate due to the cover featuring an overtly phallic spaceship that transported a naked woman, the work was edited, despite the fact that Funkadelic "was following up two consecutive million-selling records," while signed to Warner Bros. Bell revised The Electric Spanking of War Babies so the image was featured with a lime-green sketch of shape covering the majority of the cover art, which says, “Oh Look! The Cover that ‘They’ were TOO-SCARED to print!”

Critical response

"Whether or not one cares to examine its hidden political messages, Electric Spanking is an above-average party album."
AllMusic
"George Clinton reaches into the disgusting depths of his drug-addled mind and comes up with the solidest, weirdest chunk of P-Funk since one nation gathered under a groove."
Robert Christgau

Track listing

Personnel
George Clinton - lead vocals (on #1-3,5,8)
Junie Morrison - bass, rhythm guitar, keyboards and drums (1)
Roger Troutman - rhythm guitar, bass and Moog synthesizer (3)
Michael Hampton (1-3,7,8), Jerome Ali (2,7), Eddie Hazel (5) - lead guitar
DeWayne McKnight - guitar (6)
Gordon Carlton - rhythm guitar (2,7)
Jimmy Ali (2), Lige Curry (3,6,8), Rodney Curtis (7) - bass
Kenny Colton (2,6), Tyrone Lampkin (3,7) - drums 
Larry Fratangelo - percussion (3,4,6), drums (4)
Muruga Booker - electric talking drum (3)
Marion Saulsby - keyboards (7)
David Lee Chong - Moog synthesizer and keyboards (8)
Pat Rizzo (3,5), Michael Brecker (7) - saxophone
Cynthia Robinson - trumpet (3,5)
Bootsy Collins - vocals (3)
Tony Thomas - vocals
Donnie Sterling - lead vocals (6)
Garry Shider - lead vocals (7), rhythm guitar (7,8)
Sly Stone - lead vocals, rhythm guitar, keyboards and drums (5)

References

External links
 The Electric Spanking of War Babies at Discogs
The Motherpage

Funkadelic albums
1981 albums
Warner Records albums
Albums with cover art by Pedro Bell